Ian Barker may refer to:

 Ian Barker (Australian barrister) (born 1935), barrister
 Ian Barker (jurist) (born 1934), New Zealand solicitor, judge, and legal scholar
 Ian Barker (sailor) (born 1966), British sailor

See also
Ian Baker (disambiguation)